Chukwuma Okorafor (born August 8, 1997) is a Nigerian professional American football offensive tackle for the Pittsburgh Steelers of the National Football League (NFL). He played college football at Western Michigan.

Early life
Okorafor was born in Nigeria, and lived in South Africa and Botswana before his family emigrated to the United States in 2010. He attended Southfield High School in Southfield, Michigan and started at both offensive and defensive line. He was named a 3-star recruit by 247Sports and was considered the 11th best football recruit in Michigan as a senior. Chukwuma received offers from numerous programs, some of which included Arkansas, Florida, Iowa, Nebraska, North Carolina State, Ohio State, and Oklahoma, but chose to play at Western Michigan due to its close proximity to home and the school's promise to start him as a true freshman.

College career
Okorafor played college football for Western Michigan from 2014 to 2017. In 2016 and 2017, he was named to the All-MAC first-team. In 2017, he was named a FWAA First Team All-American. 
On January 27, 2018, Okorafor played in the 2018 Reese's Senior Bowl and was a part of the North team that lost 45–16 to the South team.

Professional career

Okorafor attended private workouts and visits with the Washington Redskins and Philadelphia Eagles.  He was ranked as the sixth-best offensive tackle in the draft by Sports Illustrated, the ninth-best offensive tackle by DraftScout.com, and the 11th best-offensive tackle by Scouts Inc.

 
The Pittsburgh Steelers selected Okorafor in the third round (92nd overall) of the 2018 NFL Draft. Okorafor was the 11th offensive tackle drafted in 2018. On May 22, 2018, the Pittsburgh Steelers signed Okorafor to a four-year, $3.40 million contract that included a signing bonus of $812,364.

On November 25, 2018, against the Denver Broncos, Okorafor made his first NFL start at right tackle due to injuries to Marcus Gilbert and Matt Feiler. During the 2018 NFL season, he also made two starts as a tight end, being used by the Steelers as an extra tackle.

On November 10, 2019, against the Los Angeles Rams, Okorafor made his first start of the 2019 NFL season due to an injury to Ramon Foster.

On March 14, 2022, Okorafor signed a three-year, $29.25 million contract extension with the Steelers.

References

External links
Western Michigan bio
Pittsburgh Steelers bio

1997 births
Living people
American football offensive tackles
Sportspeople from Southfield, Michigan
Western Michigan Broncos football players
Pittsburgh Steelers players
Players of American football from Michigan
Nigerian players of American football
Nigerian emigrants to the United States